Mea culpa is Latin for "my fault".

Mea culpa may also refer to:

Literature
Mea Culpa, novel by Henry Harland 
Mea Culpa, novel by Anne Holt
Mea Culpa, story by David Widgery

Film and Television

Film
Mea Maxima Culpa: Silence in the House of God, documentary film
Mea Culpa (film), a 2014 French thriller film

TV
Mea Culpa (Chilean TV series), a Spanish-language TV series broadcast by Televisión Nacional de Chile
"Mea Culpa" (CSI), an episode of the TV series CSI: Crime Scene Investigation
"Mea Culpa", an episode from season 1 of the TV series Alias
"Mea Culpa", an episode of Ultraviolet
"Mea Culpa", an episode of TV series Californication
"Mea Culpa", an episode of season 5 of Suits
 Sino ang Maysala?: Mea Culpa (Who Is the Culprit? – My Fault), a Philippine television series broadcast by ABS-CBN

Music

Albums
Mea Culpa, by Umbra et Imago
Mea Culpa (album), by After Forever, which also contains the song "Mea Culpa"
Mea Culpa, 2013 album by Clementino

Songs
"Mea Culpa" and "Mea Culpa (Part II)", songs by Enigma from the 1990 album MCMXC a.D. 
"Mea Culpa", song by Brian Eno and David Byrne from their 1981 album My Life in the Bush of Ghosts 
"Mea Culpa", song by Mike + The Mechanics from their 1995 album Beggar on a Beach of Gold 
"Mea Culpa", song by After Forever from their 2000 album Prison of Desire 
"Mea Culpa", song from The Human Abstract from their 2006 album Nocturne
"Mea Culpa", 2016 song by Souf from his 2016 album Alchimie''